A Lost Lady of Old Years is an 1899 novel by the Scottish author John Buchan. It was first published in serial form in Today. The title comes from Browning’s poem Waring.

Plot

The novel is set in Scotland during the Jacobite rising of 1745 and follows the adventures of Francis Birkenshaw, an eighteen-year-old law apprentice. It is a study of the romantic temperament and of conflicts of loyalty.

Critical reception

David Daniell, in The Interpreter's House (1975), called the novel "the story of romantic defeat, a gallant fanaticism that ended in dull retreat instead of ringing death. There is a nice decorum in the control of the material all through…". He considered that Buchan has been able to "get the darker shades moving in and out of his hero with some success".

Andrew Lownie, in John Buchan: The Presbyterian Cavalier (2013) noted that this is a more ambitious and complex book than Buchan had previously attempted, and that perhaps as a result is less successful. He considered it to have been a victim of its long and spasmodic gestation, and of Buchan's busy lifestyle.

References

External links
 
 A Lost Lady of Old Years at Project Gutenberg Australia

1899 British novels
British historical novels
Fiction set in 1745
Jacobite rising of 1745
Novels by John Buchan
Novels set in Scotland
Novels set in the 1740s